Madrasta (International title: A Place in Your Heart / ) is a 2019 Philippine drama television series broadcast by GMA Network. The series aired on the network's Afternoon Prime line up and worldwide on GMA Pinoy TV from October 7, 2019 to February 21, 2020, replacing Dahil sa Pag-ibig.

NUTAM (Nationwide Urban Television Audience Measurement) People in Television Homes ratings are provided by AGB Nielsen Philippines while Kantar Media Philippines provide Nationwide ratings (Urban + Rural).

The series ended, but it's the 20th-week run, and with 100 episodes. It was replaced by  Bilangin Ang Bituin Sa Langit.

Series overview

Episodes

References

Lists of Philippine drama television series episodes